Vicky Nguyen (born )  is a Vietnamese-born American investigative journalist working with NBC News in New York. Nguyen joined NBC News in April 2019 as the Investigative and Consumer correspondent. Her reporting has been seen on The Today Show, 3rd Hour Today, Nightly News with Lester Holt, NBC News Now and MSNBC.

Prior to moving to New York, Nguyen worked for NBC Bay Area, KNTV in the San Francisco Bay Area. There, she served as a senior investigative reporter for the NBC Bay Area Investigative Unit and anchor of the Sunday evening news on NBC Bay Area. Before joining NBC Bay Area, Nguyen worked at various television stations in Florida, Nevada and Arizona.

Early life and education 
Nguyen was born in Ho Chi Minh City, Vietnam. At a very young age, she and her parents fled Vietnam as refugees. After two days, two nights and a Thai pirate attack on the open ocean, their boat landed on the coast of Malaysia, where Nguyen and her family stayed in a refugee camp for 14 months. At age 2, Nguyen immigrated into the United States. A family in Eugene, Oregon sponsored her family to America. She spent most of her childhood in San Jose and Santa Rosa, and became a U.S. citizen at age 10.
 Nguyen went on to attend college at the University of San Francisco on an academic scholarship. During her time at the university, Nguyen was a member of the cheer squad and served as president of her student body. In 2000, she graduated as valedictorian of her class with a degree in communications and a minor in biology.

Professional career

Nguyen started her career with Central Florida News 13 in Orlando, Florida. While there, she shot, wrote and edited her stories before delivering live reports. She wrote on her blog, "I was a 'one man band.' I shot my own video on a 20 pound DVC Pro camera (and) carried my own 15 pound tripod." She then moved to ABC affiliate KOLO in Reno, Nevada as a nightside reporter and fill-in anchor.

Following her time in Reno, Nguyen moved to Phoenix, Arizona to work with KSAZ. At KSAZ, she was able to cover national stories. Notable interviews include Alex Trebek, Tyra Banks, Shaquille O'Neal and Senator John McCain. Nguyen also had the opportunity to cover the Baseline Killer and Serial Shooter investigations while with KSAZ, which was the first instance in which two separate serial killers attacked the same city at the same time.

NBC
Nguyen returned to Northern California in January 2007, and started working with NBC Bay Area as a freelance reporter. Shortly thereafter she was hired full-time, and worked as a special assignment reporter for KNTV. Nguyen was eventually promoted to anchor/senior investigative reporter with KNTV. While in that role, she worked closely with the NBC Bay Area Investigative Unit.

In April 2019, Nguyen moved from California to New York to accept a new role as an investigative and consumer correspondent for NBC News. Since joining NBC News she has been on The Today Show, 3rd Hour Today, Nightly News with Lester Holt, NBC News Daily and MSNBC.

Awards
Nguyen was honored with the 2019 Alfred I. duPont-Columbia University Award for "Drivers Under Siege" about the rise in violent attacks on Bay Area bus operators. Her work has also been recognized with the Scripps Howard Award, the Gerald Loeb Award, the National Press Club's Society of Professional Journalists Sigma Delta Chi Award, three Gracie awards, two Clarion awards, 15 regional Emmy awards and three regional Murrow awards.

In addition, she has earned several awards from the Asian American Journalists Association (AAJA) and the Radio and Television News Directors Association (RTNDA).
 2015 Scripps Howard Award - Jack R. Howard Award for Television/Cable In-Depth Local Coverage.
 2015 Gerald Loeb Award - Video/Audio Winner.
 2019 Alfred I. duPont-Columbia Award.
 2020 New York Woman of Impact by Variety

References

External links 
 

1979 births
Date of birth missing (living people)
Living people
University of San Francisco alumni
Vietnamese emigrants to the United States
People from Ho Chi Minh City
Gerald Loeb Award winners for Audio and Video
American broadcast news analysts
American investigative journalists
People from Santa Rosa, California
American people of Vietnamese descent
People from San Jose, California
Journalists from California